Laevinesta atlantica is a species of sea snail, a marine gastropod mollusk in the family Fissurellidae, the keyhole limpets.

Description
A species of sea snail often residing in light coloured shells and are a specific species within the genus of Laevvinesta.

Distribution

References

Fissurellidae
Gastropods described in 1947